The St. James Episcopal Church and Rectory in Bozeman, Montana was listed on the National Register of Historic Places in 1987.  The listing included two contributing buildings (the church and the rectory).

The church and rectory are "significant for their association with the early social history of Bozeman."  Episcopal services were held in Bozeman by 1868, and a church site was secured in 1869, and a wood frame and board and batten church was completed in 1876.

Construction of the brick rectory, at 5 W. Olive, was begun in the early 1880s and completed in 1883.  It was built in a transitional Italianate/Queen Anne style, but many details were replaced by plainer Colonial Revival elements in the 1930s.

The current church building, at 9 W. Olive in Bozeman, was built during 1889–90. It was designed by regional architect George Hancock of Fargo, North Dakota, who had opened a branch office in Bozeman by the late 1880s. It is a cruciform-plan Gothic Revival church built of grey sandstone pointed with blue mortar.

References

National Register of Historic Places in Gallatin County, Montana
Gothic Revival church buildings in Montana
Colonial Revival architecture in Montana
Churches completed in 1883
Buildings and structures completed in 1890
Buildings and structures in Bozeman, Montana
Episcopal church buildings in Montana
Churches on the National Register of Historic Places in Montana
Clergy houses in the United States